The White River Range is a mountain range in White Pine County, Nevada.

References 

Mountain ranges of Nevada
Mountain ranges of White Pine County, Nevada